Camellia Moses Okpodu (born January 24, 1964 in Portsmouth, Virginia), is a college professor and dean.

Education and early life
Camellia Okpodu graduated in 1982 from West Brunswick High School, Shallotte, North Carolina. She received both her undergraduate and postgraduate education from North Carolina State University (Raleigh, North Carolina), earning a B.S. in Biochemistry (1987) and a Ph.D. in Plant Physiology and Biochemistry (1994).

In 1984, Camellia became the first Black woman to hold the title for Miss Brunswick County, a preliminary scholarship pageant for Miss America.

Career 
Okpodu is a dean at the University of Wyoming as of 2021. She was also a biology professor and dean at Xavier University of Louisiana (XULA), a professor and chair at Norfolk State University (NSU), and was the 2007–2008 American Council of Education Fellow.

References

American women biochemists
Living people
1964 births
American women biologists
20th-century American women scientists
Elizabeth City State University faculty
Norfolk State University faculty
North Carolina State University alumni
American women academics
21st-century American women